Tobias Gunte (born 11 April 1997) is a German professional footballer who plays as a defender for Regionalliga Nordost club Viktoria Berlin.

References

1997 births
Living people
German footballers
Footballers from Berlin
Association football defenders
FC Viktoria 1889 Berlin players
3. Liga players
Regionalliga players
21st-century German people